Warren Grant Munro (August 7, 1936 – December 30, 2019) was a Canadian ice hockey defenseman who was an All-American for Denver and helped the team win consecutive national championships in the early-1960s.

Career
Munro grew up in Regina and played for his home town junior team, the Regina Pats. He helped the club win consecutive Abbott Cups in 1955 and 1956. In 1957, he followed his former junior coach Murray Armstrong to the University of Denver and began playing for the Pioneers. He joined the varsity squad in 1958. Munro helped the team win championships in 1960 and 1961 and was an All-American in his senior season. In the 1961 championship, he recorded four points in Denver's 12–2 win, setting a record for defensemen in a title match. Munro earned a bachelor's degree in accounting.

Career 
After graduating from college, Munro briefly played professional hockey for the Omaha Knights/Toledo Mercurys in the International Hockey League, but retired after the 1962 season. Munro worked as a hockey coach at North Yarmouth Academy in the 1980s and founded co-founded the Casco Bay Hockey Association. He was also a linesman for the Maine Mariners.

Personal life 
Munro and his wife, Ileen, moved to Maine in 1967 and remained there until his death due to complications from Parkinson's disease in 2019.

Career statistics

Awards and honors

References

External links

1936 births
2019 deaths
AHCA Division I men's ice hockey All-Americans
Canadian ice hockey defencemen
Deaths from Parkinson's disease
Denver Pioneers men's ice hockey players
Ice hockey people from Saskatchewan
NCAA men's ice hockey national champions
Neurological disease deaths in Maine
Omaha Knights (IHL) players
Regina Pats players
Sportspeople from Regina, Saskatchewan
Toledo Mercurys players
People from Brunswick, Maine
Ice hockey people from Maine
University of Denver alumni